Nardi may refer to:

Industrial
 Nardi (agricultural machinery manufacturer), Italian manufacturer of agricultural machinery
 Nardi (carmaker), an Italian automobile and racing car maker
 Nardi 750LM, an automobile, one of the starters for the 1955 24-hour Le Mans race
 Fratelli Nardi, an Italian aircraft manufacturer formed in the early 1930s
 Nardi FN.305, a fighter trainer and liaison monoplane, 1935
 Nardi FN.310, a four-seat touring monoplane, 1936
 Nardi FN.315, a training monoplane, 1938
 Nardi FN.316, an advanced fighter trainer monoplane, 1941
 Nardi FN.333, a luxury touring amphibious aircraft, 1952

Science
 26268 Nardi, a minor planet in the main asteroid belt
 Nardi test, a medical diagnostic test
 Quassia sp. 'Mount Nardi', a plant found in northeastern New South Wales, Australia

Other uses
 Nardi (game), a Russian tables game played on a backgammon board
 Nardi (name), including a list of people with the name
 Licciana Nardi, a comune in the Province of Massa and Carrara, Tuscany, Italy

See also
 Nardis (disambiguation)
 De Nardi, a cycling team based in Italy, 1999–2005